Wese LeRoy Callahan (July 3, 1888 – September 13, 1953) was a Major League Baseball shortstop who played for the St. Louis Cardinals in .

External links

1888 births
1953 deaths
Major League Baseball shortstops
St. Louis Cardinals players
Baseball players from Indiana
Winchester Hustlers players
Battle Creek Crickets players
Jacksonville Tarpons players
Wheeling Stogies players
Jackson Vets players